Silje Jørgensen Anzjøn (born 5 May 1977) is a Norwegian former footballer who debuted for the Norway women's national football team in 1996, and won 43 caps. She played in the national team at the 1999 FIFA Women's World Cup and received a gold medal at the 2000 Summer Olympics in Sydney. At club level Jørgensen played 178 times and scored 46 goals in six seasons with Klepp IL of the Toppserien.

References

External links
 
 Norwegian national team profile 
 

1977 births
Living people
Norwegian women's footballers
Footballers at the 2000 Summer Olympics
Olympic footballers of Norway
Olympic gold medalists for Norway
Olympic medalists in football
Klepp IL players
Toppserien players
1999 FIFA Women's World Cup players
Norway women's international footballers
Medalists at the 2000 Summer Olympics
Women's association football midfielders
Sportspeople from Kristiansand